William Robert Smaltz Sr. (March 17, 1918 – September 14, 2001) was an American football player and coach. He served as the head football coach at Juniata College in Huntingdon, Pennsylvania from 1947 to 1953, compiling a 32–17–2 record including an undefeated season in 1953.  As a collegiate athlete, he quarterbacked the Penn State Nittany Lions football squad for three seasons and earned a selection by the Philadelphia Eagles in the 1942 NFL Draft.

References

1918 births
2001 deaths
American football quarterbacks
Juniata Eagles football coaches
NC State Wolfpack football coaches
Penn State Nittany Lions football players
People from Aliquippa, Pennsylvania
Players of American football from Pennsylvania